The Showgirl Must Go On was a concert residency at The Colosseum at Caesars Palace in Las Vegas that starred pop diva Bette Midler. Showgirl premiered on February 20, 2008 and closed on January 31, 2010. Midler signed for 300 shows from 2008 to 2010 at a pace of 100 performances a year. Shows were presented five nights a week with the house dark on Mondays and Thursdays. According to Billboard, the residency grossed $72 million.

Setlist
 "Big Noise from Winnetka"
 "The Showgirl Must Go On"
 "In the Mood"
 "Friends"
 "The Rose"
 "Do You Want to Dance?"
 "From a Distance"
 "My Kind of Town"
 "It's Now or Never"
 "Viva Las Vegas"
 "Lucky Be My Lady"
 "Blue Hawaii"
 "Hello in There"
 "When a Man Loves a Woman"
 "Pretty Legs"
 "Hot in Here"
 "The Glory of Love"
 "Boogie Woogie Bugle Boy"
 "Wind Beneath My Wings"

Concert dates
All shows were performed at The Colosseum at Caesars Palace in Las Vegas, Nevada.

Recordings
On December 31, 2010, The Showgirl Must Go On was broadcast on HBO channels at 9 pm. The 70 minute special contained some of the performances from the 2 hour long show. 

The DVD of this pared down performance was released on October 4, 2011.

References

Bette Midler concert tours
Bette Midler video albums
Concert residencies in the Las Vegas Valley
2008 concert residencies
2009 concert residencies
2010 concert residencies
Caesars Palace